ADAMTS14 encodes a member of the ADAMTS protein family. Members of the family share several distinct protein modules, including a propeptide region, a metalloproteinase domain, a disintegrin-like domain, and a thrombospondin type 1 (TS) motif. Individual members of this family differ in the number of C-terminal TS motifs, and some have unique C-terminal domains. Mature enzyme is generated by the proteolytically process of the encoded preproprotein. The enzyme cleaves the amino-propeptides of fibrillar collagens, enabling collagen fibril formation prior to assembly of collagen, which is a major extracellular matrix (ECM) protein.

References

ADAMTS